Anne Burke (fl. 1780-1805) was an Irish novelist in the Gothic genre. She was one of the earliest women writers of Gothic fiction.

Life and work
Anne Burke had been a governess and was widowed with a son. She took up writing to support herself and her family.  Becoming a writer did not provide the wealth she had hoped for. She applied for relief several times to the Royal Literary Fund from whom she received a total of 13 guineas. As a governess she hoped to set up a school despite having had to nurse her son through smallpox. She wrote multiple successful novels in the Gothic style, though she was known too for her melodramatic style.

Her novel Adela Northington was just one of the huge rise in numbers of new publications in 1796. It was a huge jump from the previous year.

Ela: or The Delusions of the Heart was one of the books translated into multiple other languages. It was reprinted several times. This book may have been an influence on Ann Radcliffe’s The Romance of the Forest. She is sometimes considered one of the key Irish authors in the development of Gothic fiction along with Regina Maria Roche, Mrs F. C. Patrick, Anna Millikin, Catharine Selden, Marianne Kenley, and Sydney Owenson (later Lady Morgan)

Critical reception

English Review /JAS, 1796 p377
 
 Adela Northington; a Novel. In Three Volumes. By Mrs. Burke. pp. 414. 12mo. 10s. boards. Cawthorn, Strand. London, 1796. We wish it came within the limits of this publication to relate the story of Adela Northington, and do justice to its author. We recommend it for its lively fancy and flowing style; proper, impressive, and animated, without affectation. There are many parts of this work that will draw the tear of sensibility; at the same time that there are others that will amuse the more lively reader. The whole is much superior to any thing of the kind that had lately come into our hands before we read [Inchbald's Nature and Art, likewise here reviewed].

Monthly Magazine / JAS, 1801 vol. 11 (1801): 606.

Mr [sic] Burke's 'Elliot, or, the Vicissitudes of Early Life,' is a well-written and pathetic narration.

Burke is one of the "lost" women writers listed by Dale Spender in Mothers of the Novel: 100 Good Women Writers Before Jane Austen.

Bibliography
 Ela; or, The Delusions of the Heart, 1787
 Emilia de St. Aubigne, 1788
 Adela Northington, 1796
 The Sorrows of Edith, 1796
 Elliott; or, Vicissitudes of Early Life, 1800
 The Secret of the Cavern, 1805

References 

18th-century Irish women writers
18th-century Irish writers
19th-century Irish women writers
19th-century Irish writers
Women romantic fiction writers
Irish romantic fiction writers
Irish novelists
Irish women novelists
Women horror writers
Irish horror writers
Writers of Gothic fiction